Giorgos Konstadinou (born October 27, 1934 in Vathi, Athens) is a Greek actor, writer, and director. He is the son of actress Nitsa Filosofou. His career was boosted after the 'profiterole' scene in the movie Ktipokardia sto thranio and reached its pinnacle with the comedy film The... Kopanoi in the 1980s. He has written and acted in several plays and TV series.

Filmography

Movies

Television
Anthropines istories 1975 (TV)
Ase ton kosmo na gelasei 1975 (TV) (Also Directed)
Treis kai o koukos 1985 (TV) (Also Directed)
Mi mou girnas tin plati 1986 (TV) (Also Directed)
I Alepou kai o boufos 1987 (TV) (Also Directed)
Patir, yios kai pnevma 1990 (TV) (Also Directed)
Aggelos kata lathos 1990 (TV)
Ta Efta kaka tis moiras mou 1991 (TV) (Also Directed)
Zoe patini 1995 (TV) (Also Directed)
Alli to proi alli to vradi 1995 (TV) (Also Directed)
Diplani porta 1997 (TV) (Also Directed)
To Berdema 2000 (TV) (Also Directed)
Ta Filarakia 2002 (TV) (Also Directed)
Odos Paradeisou 7 2006 (TV)

References

External links
 

1934 births
Living people
Greek male film actors
Greek male stage actors
Greek male television actors
Greek film directors
Male actors from Athens
Film people from Athens